Diana Patricia Sands (August 22, 1934September 21, 1973) was an American actress, perhaps most known for her portrayal of Beneatha Younger, the sister of Sidney Poitier's character, Walter, in the original stage and film versions of Lorraine Hansberry's A Raisin in the Sun (1961).

Sands also appeared in a number of dramatic television series in the 1960s and 1970s such as I Spy, as Davala Unawa in the 1967 The Fugitive episode "Dossier on a Diplomat", Dr. Harrison in the Outer Limits episode "The Mice", and Julia. Sands also starred in the 1963 film An Affair of the Skin as the narrator and photographer, Janice. For her work, Sands was twice nominated for a Tony Award and twice nominated for an Emmy Award.

Biography

Early life and education
Diana Patricia Sands was born one of three children in the Bronx, New York City, on August 22, 1934 to Rudolph Sands, a Bahamian carpenter, and Shirley (née Thomas), a milliner. For her early education, Sands attended elementary school in Elmsford, New York. Sands enrolled at the Music & Art High School (which is now identified as Fiorello H. LaGuardia High School) in 1949, where she was a classmate of Diahann Carroll and Billy Dee Williams. During high school, Sands received her first role in the school production of George Bernard Shaw's "Major Barbara". After graduation from high school in 1953, Sands began her professional career as a dancer; touring with a traveling carnival.

Career
 In 1959, Sands landed the role of Beneatha Younger for the Broadway production of Lorraine Hansberry's A Raisin in the Sun. Two years later, in 1961 Sands co-starred alongside Claudia McNeil, Sidney Poitier and Ruby Dee for the film version of the play.

Sands later became a member of the Actors Studio, 
In 1964, Sands was in a production of James Baldwin's Blues for Mr. Charlie. Her performance was noted as a highlight of the show. Sands didn't continue the role due to a subsequent London engagement that Sands had previously committed, the original Broadway production of The Owl and the Pussycat; co-starring Alan Alda. For her role in the production, Sands was nominated for a Tony Award for Best Actress in a Leading Role.

In 1970, Sands co-starred in the film The Landlord, and then appeared in Doctors' Wives and Georgia, Georgia. During this time, Sands met musician Bob Dylan. In his memoirs, Dylan tells of meeting Sands at a party and states that she was, "an electrifying actress who I might have been secretly in love with ..." In 1972, Sands was sought to provide a track for the Original New York Cast album of Free to Be... You and Me. However, Sands had died by the time the ABC Afterschool Special had begun production and her previously recorded vocal track was not selected for inclusion. During the fall of 1972, Sands filmed Honeybaby, Honeybaby on location in Beirut, Lebanon co-starring Calvin Lockhart. According to Lockhart, Sands went to a local hospital during the filming in Lebanon; stating his belief that Sands knew she was seriously ill. In early 1973, Sands returned to New York City and began filming Willie Dynamite, a blaxploitation film starring alongside Roscoe Orman.

In late-August 1973, Sands began filming Claudine alongside James Earl Jones in the Harlem section of New York City.  According to an October 1973 article in Jet, Sands later collapsed during the filming and was rushed to a local hospital in early–September 1973. Upon surgery, Doctors discovered a cancerous growth in Sands' abdomen, which was diagnosed as pancreatic cancer. Sands had only began filming a week earlier when she collapsed. Due to her aggressive illness, Sands was unable to film and suggested to producers that her longtime friend Diahann Carroll replace her in the film; the film's producers agreed and cast Carroll.

Personal life, death and legacy
Sands was married once and had no children. From October 1964 until 1966, Sands was married to Swiss artist Lucien Happersberger. At the time of her death, Sands was engaged to Kurt Baker, who was an assistant film director. On September 21, 1973, Sands died of leiomyosarcoma at Memorial Sloan-Kettering Hospital in New York City; aged 39. Sands' Funeral Mass was held on October 5, 1973 at St. Catherine of Siena Church in Manhattan, New York. Afterwards, she was buried at Ferncliff Cemetery and Mausoleum in Hartsdale, New York. In 1976, Junior High School 147, located in the Bronx, New York, was named in Sands' honor. Sands Street in Brooklyn, which dates from the 1700s, is not named after her.

Selected credits

Theatre

Partial filmography

Caribbean Gold (1952) - Native Woman (uncredited)
Four Boys and a Gun (1957) - (uncredited)
A Face in the Crowd (1957) - Homeless Black Woman (uncredited)
Carib Gold (1957)
Odds Against Tomorrow (1959) - Club Hostess (uncredited)
A Raisin in the Sun (1961) - Beneatha Younger
An Affair of the Skin (1963) - Janice
Ensign Pulver (1964) - Mila
The Landlord (1970) - Fanny
Doctors' Wives (1971) - Helen Straughn
Georgia, Georgia (1972) - Georgia Martin
Willie Dynamite (1974) - Cora
Honeybaby, Honeybaby (1974) - Laura Lewis (final film role)

References

External links

 
 
 
 
 
 Yale University article with photo 

1934 births
1973 deaths
African-American actresses
American people of Bahamian descent
Burials at Ferncliff Cemetery
Actresses from New York City
20th-century American actresses
American stage actresses
American television actresses
American film actresses
Obie Award recipients
The High School of Music & Art alumni
Theatre World Award winners
Deaths from cancer in New York (state)
Deaths from leiomyosarcoma
20th-century African-American women
20th-century African-American people
African-American Catholics